Rémi Taffin (born 14 March 1975) is a French engineer who is the technical director of French firm Oreca. He was previously the engine technical director for the French Formula 1 team Alpine F1 and Renault Sport.

He graduated in mechanical engineering from the École supérieure des techniques aéronautiques et de construction automobile (ESTACA). Taffin began his career in motorsport when he became a racing engineer in 1998 in the Signature stable in Formula 3. The following year, he got a job at Renault and worked with their clients such as Arrows, Benetton Formula, British American Racing (BAR) and Renault F1. Until 2009, Taffin was an engine race engineer for Fernando Alonso, Jenson Button, Heikki Kovalainen, Jos Verstappen and Ricardo Zonta, among others.

He was involved when the driver Fernando Alonso and the team won both the drivers' and constructors' championships for the 2005 and 2006 seasons. In 2009, he became head of engine performance at races and worked with the teams that used Renault engines, including Red Bull Racing, which won four straight drivers' and constructors' championships (2010-2013). In 2014, he was promoted to COO of Renault's engine manufacturers and two years later he was appointed technical, a position he left in June 2021.

In December 2021, Taffin began as Oreca's technical director.

References

1975 births
Living people
Formula One engine engineers
Renault people